Ischnocampa celer is a moth of the family Erebidae. It was described by William Schaus in 1892. It is found in Brazil.

References

Ischnocampa
Moths described in 1892